Yafa Yarkoni (also Yaffa Yarqoni, 24 December 1925 – 1 January 2012) was an Israeli singer, winner of the Israel Prize in 1998 for Hebrew song. She was dubbed Israel's "songstress of the wars" due to her frequent performances for Israel Defense Forces soldiers, especially in wartime. She was from a Mountain Jewish family.

Biography
Yafa Abramov (later Yafa Gustin and Yafa Yarkoni) was born in Giv'at Rambam (today a neighbourhood of Giv'atayim) to a Jewish family that immigrated from the Caucasus. At the age of ten, she studied ballet dancing under Gertrude Kraus, one of Israel's dance pioneers.

In the 1940s, her mother ran a café in Givat Rambam, where Yafa performed with her sister Tikva and her brother Binyamin. On 21 September 1944, she married Joseph Gustin, who fought in World War II with the Jewish Brigade and was killed in battle in Italy in 1945.

Yarkoni married Shaike Yarkoni in 1948. They had three daughters.

In 2000, Yarkoni was diagnosed with Alzheimer's disease. According to her daughter, Haaretz journalist Orit Shochat, her condition worsened in 2007. That year she appeared for the last time on a television show produced in her honor by the Israel Broadcasting Authority.

Music career
In 1948, during Israel's 1948 Arab-Israeli War, Yarkoni joined an IDF song troupe affiliated with the Givati Brigade. Bab el-Wad, a song she performed at the time, became a classic, sung every year on Israel's Memorial Day. After the war, she performed songs for a program on the Kol Yisrael radio station.

Most of Yarkoni's songs were written by Tuli Reviv and Haim Hefer. Yarkoni also performed some of Naomi Shemer's early children's songs.

Among her most well-known songs are "Don't Say Goodbye, Say I Will See You," about a soldier parting from his girlfriend before battle, and "Road to Jerusalem," about soldiers transporting food to Jerusalem when the city was under siege in 1948.

Awards
In 1998, Yarkoni was awarded the Israel Prize, for Hebrew song.

Death
On 1 January 2012, Yarkoni died at Reut Medical Center in Tel Aviv, a week after her 86th birthday. She is buried in the Kiryat Shaul cemetery in Tel Aviv, beside her husband.

See also
List of Israel Prize recipients
Music of Israel

References

External links
Nathan Shahar, Yafa Yarkoni, Jewish Women Encyclopedia
Yafa Yarkoni "Songstress of the Wars", Exhibition in the IDF&defense establishment archives

1925 births
2012 deaths
Israeli people of Mountain Jewish descent
Israel Prize in Hebrew song recipients
Israel Prize women recipients
20th-century Israeli women singers
People from Givatayim
Deaths from Alzheimer's disease
Deaths from dementia in Israel
Jews in Mandatory Palestine
Burials at Kiryat Shaul Cemetery